The 2000 World Junior Curling Championships were held at Geising, Germany March 18–26.

Men's

Playoffs

Women's

Tie-breaker
 7-5

Playoffs

Sources

J
World Junior Curling Championships
2000 in German sport
Sport in Altenberg, Saxony
International curling competitions hosted by Germany
March 2000 sports events in Europe
2000s in Saxony
2000 in youth sport